"Say It's Not True" is a song written and recorded by American country music artist Lionel Cartwright.  It was released in December 1990 as the third single from the album I Watched It on the Radio.  The song reached #31 on the Billboard Hot Country Singles & Tracks chart.

Chart performance

References

1990 singles
1990 songs
Lionel Cartwright songs
Songs written by Lionel Cartwright
Song recordings produced by Tony Brown (record producer)
MCA Records singles